Attorney General Howell may refer to:

Charles Gough Howell (1894–1942), Attorney General of Fiji
David Howell (jurist) (1747–1824), Attorney General of Rhode Island

See also
General Howell (disambiguation)